Odessa Township is a township in Jewell County, Kansas, USA.  As of the 2000 census, its population was 34.

Geography
Odessa Township covers an area of 35.88 square miles (92.94 square kilometers); of this, 0.01 square miles (0.02 square kilometers) or 0.02 percent is water. The stream of Porcupine Creek runs through this township.

Unincorporated towns
 Dentonia
(This list is based on USGS data and may include former settlements.)

Cemeteries
Odessa Cemetery (south of Odessa United Methodist Church)

Adjacent townships
 Esbon Township (north)
 Limestone Township (northeast)
 Ionia Township (east)
 Athens Township (southeast)
 Erving Township (south)
 Lincoln Township, Smith County (southwest)
 Webster Township, Smith County (west)
 Oak Township, Smith County (northwest)

References
 U.S. Board on Geographic Names (GNIS)
 United States Census Bureau cartographic boundary files

External links
 US-Counties.com
 City-Data.com

Townships in Jewell County, Kansas
Townships in Kansas